Italy competed at the 2023 European Athletics Indoor Championships in Istanbul, Turkey (Ataköy Athletics Arena), from 2 to 5 March 2023.

In this edition of the championships, Italy won six medals, 4 of which were gold, finishing in 4th place in the medal table.

Medalists

Top eight

Twenty Italian competitors including the  women's relay team reached the top eight in this edition of the championships and the team won the placing table for the first time of the its history.

Men

Women

See also
 Italy national athletics team

References

External links
 EAA official site

2023
2023 European Athletics Indoor Championships
2023 in Italian sport